Extremely Live is a live album by American rapper Vanilla Ice. It was released on March 6, 1991 via SBK Records. Recording sessions took place at Knight Center in Miami, at Tupperware in Kissimmee, at Auditorium in West Palm Beach, at Music Hall in Cleveland, at Veterans Memorial Auditorium in Columbus, at Syria Mosque in Pittsburgh, and at Sundome in Tampa during To the Extreme world tour from January to March 1991. Production was handled by Gail "Sky" King, DJ Earthquake, Peter Loomis, Khayree, Kim Sharp and Vanilla Ice himself.

Released in March 1991, it is the rapper's second major label release, after To the Extreme. The album contains material from Van Winkle's debut album, Hooked, as well as the new songs "Rollin' in My 5.0", "Road to My Riches", "Move" and "I Like It". The album peaked at #30 on the Billboard 200.

Reception
David Browne of Entertainment Weekly gave the album a D, calling it "one of the most ridiculous albums ever released". Browne compared the album to The Best of Marcel Marceau, an album which consisted of two sides of silence opened by brief applause. According to Browne, Extremely Live "affords you the chance to hear inane stage patter [...] and unaccompanied drumming, during which, one assumes, Ice and his posse are onstage dancing". Robert Christgau gave the album a dud rating. AllMusic reviewer Steve Huey wrote that the album is "not so much awful as instantly forgettable".

Track listing

Charts

Certifications

References

External links

1991 live albums
SBK Records live albums
Vanilla Ice live albums